Harvey Frederick Sand (January 20, 1927 - August 11, 2019), was an American politician who was a member of the North Dakota State Senate. He served from 1993–2000. He served in the United States Army.

References

1927 births
2019 deaths
Republican Party North Dakota state senators